Xhelilaj is an Albanian surname. Notable people with this surname include:

Klodian Xhelilaj (born 1988), Albanian football goalkeeper
Nik Xhelilaj (born 1983), Albanian actor

Albanian-language surnames